Agave salmiana var. ferox (Agave ferox) is a variety of the species Agave salmiana belonging to the genus Agave and the family Asparagaceae.

It is very close to the typical subspecies in terms of description and culture.

It is differentiated by even thicker and stiffer leaves, a terminal sting (up to 8 cm) and even sharper lateral spines. This is also what earned it its name.

References

salmiana var. ferox
Flora of Mexico
Plants described in 1860